Nuwara Eliya electoral district is one of the 22 multi-member electoral districts of Sri Lanka created by the 1978 Constitution of Sri Lanka. The district is conterminous with the administrative district of Nuwara Eliya in the Central province. The district currently elects 7 of the 225 members of the Sri Lankan Parliament and had 457,137 registered electors in 2010.

1982 Presidential Election
Results of the 1st presidential election held on 20 October 1982 for the district:

1988 Presidential Election
Results of the 2nd presidential election held on 19 December 1988 for the district:

1989 Parliamentary General Election
Results of the 9th parliamentary election held on 15 February 1989 for the district:

The following candidates were elected:
Gamini Dissanayake (UNP), 73,790 preference votes (pv); Dilshard Rohan Tissa Abhayagunasekera (UNP), 35,375 pv; Renuka Herath (UNP), 31,271 pv; Wijesundara Bandara Ranatunga (UNP), 29,067 pv; Ananda Dassanayake Dasanayake Mudiyanselage (SLFP), 23,418 pv; and S. B. Dissanayake (SLFP), 18,986 pv.

1993 Provincial Council Election
Results of the 2nd Central provincial council election held on 17 May 1993 for the district:

1994 Parliamentary General Election
Results of the 10th parliamentary election held on 16 August 1994 for the district:

The following candidates were elected:
Muthu Sivalingam (CWC), 85,490 preference votes (pv); Suppaiah Sathasivam (CWC), 83,368 pv; Arumugam Thondaman (CWC), 75,297 pv; Renuka Herath (UNP), 49,473 pv; Abhayagunasekara Dilshard Rohan Tissa (UNP), 40,513 pv; S. B. Dissanayake (PA), 38,372 pv, C. B. Rathnayake (PA), 38,092 pv; and Periyasamy Chandrasekaran (Ind), 23,453 pv.

1994 Presidential Election
Results of the 3rd presidential election held on 9 November 1994 for the district:

1999 Provincial Council Election
Results of the 3rd Central provincial council election held on 6 April 1999 for the district:

1999 Presidential Election
Results of the 4th presidential election held on 21 December 1999 for the district:

2000 Parliamentary General Election
Results of the 11th parliamentary election held on 10 October 2000 for the district:

The following candidates were elected:
S. B. Dissanayake (PA), 78,903 preference votes (pv); Arumugan Thondaman (PA-CWC), 61,779 pv; Muthu Sivalingam (PA-CWC), 55,673 pv; Navin Dissanayake (UNP), 55,587 pv; K. Jagatheesan (PA-CWC), 50,735 pv; Periyasamy Chandrasekaran (UCPF), 54,681 pv; and Suppaiah Sathasivam (UNP), 47,472 pv.

2001 Parliamentary General Election
Results of the 12th parliamentary election held on 5 December 2001 for the district:

The following candidates were elected:
Arumugam Thondaman (UNF-CWC), 121,542 preference votes (pv); Periyasamy Chandrasekaran (UNF-UCPF), 121,421 pv; Muthu Sivalingam (UNF-CWC), 107,338 pv; Navin Dissanayake (UNF), 74,894 pv; Kaladugoda Kankanamge Piyadasa (UNF), 54,206 pv; C. B. Rathnayake (PA), 49,673 pv; and Dissanayake Mudiyanselage Shantha Kumara Dassanayake (PA), 35,504 pv.

2004 Parliamentary General Election
Results of the 13th parliamentary election held on 2 April 2004 for the district:

The following candidates were elected:
Arumugam Thondaman (UNF-CWC), 99,783 preference votes (pv); Muthu Sivalingam (UNF-CWC), 85,708 pv; S. Jegadhiswaran (UNF-CWC), 81,386 pv; S. B. Dissanayake (UNF-UNP), 71,723 pv; C. B. Rathnayake (UPFA-SLFP), 55,284 pv; N. D. N. P. Jayasinghe (UPFA-JVP), 44,229 pv; and Periyasamy Chandrasekaran (UCPF), 42,582 pv.

S. B. Dissanayake (UNF-UNP) vacated his seat on 7 December 2004 after being jailed by the Sri Lankan Supreme Court for contempt of court. His replacement Renuka Herath (UNF-UNP) was sworn in on 30 January 2006.

Periyasamy Chandrasekaran (UCPF) died on 1 January 2010. His replacement Santhanam Arulsamy (UCPF) was sworn in on 5 February 2010.

2004 Provincial Council Election
Results of the 4th Central provincial council election held on 10 July 2004 for the district:

The following candidates were elected:
Velusami Radhakrishnan (UNP), 44,525 preference votes (pv); S. B. Dissanayake (UNP), 33,869 pv; Kandasamy Ponniyah Govindaraja (UNP), 31,501 pv; Muttusamy Nadaraja Pille (UNP), 28,008 pv; R.M.S.B. Rathnayaka (UPFA), 27,997 pv; Sikkan Mukan Vellayan (UNP), 23,252 pv; Sivaraja Anushshaya (UNP), 22,073 pv; Sadayan Balachandran (UNP), 21,713 pv; Renuka Herath (UNP), 21,485 pv; S. Arulsami (UCPF), 18,964 pv; S.P. Thigambaram (UCPF), 18,387 pv; Jayarathna Dissanayake (UPFA), 17,894 pv; Nimal Piyatissa (UPFA), 17,111 pv; Aquelas De Silva Arachchige (UPFA), 16,683 pv; A. Waggama Gamaralalage Ranasinghe (UPFA), 16,262 pv; and Hewagamage Don Chinthaka Saminda Kularathna (UPFA), 12,443 pv.

2005 Presidential Election
Results of the 5th presidential election held on 17 November 2005 for the district:

2009 Provincial Council Election
Results of the 5th Central provincial council election held on 14 February 2009 for the district:

The following candidates were elected:
Palani Digambaran (UNP), 45,229 preference votes (pv); S. B. Dissanayake (UPFA), 39,005 pv; Palani Adawan Prakash Ganeshan (UNP), 38,362 pv; M. Udayakumar (UNP), 32,409 pv; R.M.S.B. Rathnayaka (UPFA), 30,114 pv; S. Kumara Dasanayake (UPFA), 30,006 pv; M. Rameshwaran (UPFA), 21,544 pv; Dissanayake Mudiyanselage Jayalath Bandara (UNP), 21,350 pv; Kaladhugoda Kankanamge Piyadasa (UNP), 20,902 pv; Suppaiah Sathasivam (UNP), 20,462 pv; Nimal Piyatissa (UPFA), 19,961 pv; Ramasami Muththaiah (UPFA), 18,990 pv; Jayarathna Dissanayake (UPFA), 18,897 pv; Velusami Radhakrishnan (UPFA), 18,513 pv; Wimali Karunarathne (UPFA), 17,982 pv; and Sri Kanapathi Kanagaraja (UNP), 15,547 pv.

2010 Presidential Election
Results of the 6th presidential election held on 26 January 2010 for the district:

2010 Parliamentary General Election
Results of the 14th parliamentary election held on 8 April 2010 for the district:

The following candidates were elected:
Arumugam Thondaman (UPFA-CWC), 60,997 preference votes (pv); Velusami Radhakrishnan (UPFA-CWC), 54,083 pv; Perumal Rajadore (UPFA-CWC), 49,228 pv; Navin Dissanayake (UPFA), 43,514 pv; C. B. Rathnayake (UPFA-SLFP), 41,345 pv; Palani Digambaran (UNF-NUW), 39,490 pv; and Sri Ranga Jeyaratnam (UNF-CF), 33,948 pv.

The National Union of Workers left the United National Front alliance on 22 April 2010 after a dispute over National List seats. Palani Digambaran (UNF-NUW), their sole MP, is to function as an independent MP.

References

Electoral districts of Sri Lanka
Politics of Nuwara Eliya District